Patriarch Athanasius of Constantinople may refer to:

 Athanasius I of Constantinople, Ecumenical Patriarch in 1289–1293 and 1303–1310
Patriarch Athanasius II of Constantinople (r. 1450–1453)